Cumbernauld Airport  is a general aviation airport located  northeast of Glasgow at Cumbernauld in North Lanarkshire, Scotland.  The airport is primarily used for the training of fixed wing and rotary wing pilots; it also boasts a helicopter charter company and a light aircraft charter operation along with aircraft maintenance facility.

Cumbernauld Aerodrome has a CAA Ordinary Licence (Number P827) that allows flights for the public transport of passengers or for flying instruction as authorised by the licensee (Cormack Aircraft Services Limited).

History
The new airport was opened by the Cumbernauld Development Corpororation in the late 1980s. Before the new airport was constructed there was a grass strip in use on the same site.  During the early years of the airport's new incarnation there was even an airshow, the highlight being a display by the Red Arrows and a mock dogfight between a Supermarine Spitfire and a German Messerschmitt Bf 109 fighter.

Operators

Training organisations: Phoenix Flight Training, Border Air Training, Heli Air.

Other Operators: PDG Helicopters (helicopter charters) and Hebridean Air Services (twin engine Britten-Norman Islander charter).

Maintenance Organisation: Cormack Islander Aircraft (Islander Aircraft Limited).

Also located on the airfield is the active West of Scotland strut of the Light Aircraft Association (formerly the Popular Flying Association).

References

Airports in Scotland
Cumbernauld